Justice McBride may refer to:

Priestly H. McBride, associate justice of the Supreme Court of Missouri
Robert McBride (Indiana judge), associate justice of the Indiana Supreme Court
Thomas A. McBride, chief justice of the Oregon Supreme Court